Jūlija Tepliha or Julia Teplih (born June 26, 1984 in Riga, Latvia) is a Latvian figure skater. She is the 2001 Latvian national champion.

External links
 

Latvian female single skaters
1984 births
Living people
Sportspeople from Riga